Giovanni Battista Orsini, or Jean-Baptiste des Ursins, was the 39th Grand Master of the Order of the Knights Hospitaller from 1467 to 1476.

References
Musée de Cluny

Coat of arms of the House of Orsinis from the castle of Rodos (Rhodes) who belonged to the Grand Master Giovanni Battista degli Orsini.

Grand Masters of the Knights Hospitaller
Giovanni Battista
15th-century Italian people